Alexander Poliakoff  (20 August 1910 – 26 July 1996) was a Russian Empire-born British electronics engineer, inventor and businessman, and the chairman of Multitone Electronics for over 40 years.

Poliakoff was born in 1910 at his parents' country house at Losino-Ostrovskaya, near Moscow, the only son of Joseph Poliakoff, a Russian-Jewish telephone and sound engineer and inventor, and Flora Shabbat, the granddaughter of a textile millionaire. He was of Jewish descent.

In 1946, Poliakoff married Ina Montagu (died 1991), granddaughter of the British-Jewish banker Samuel Montagu, 1st Baron Swaythling. Their elder son is the chemist Sir Martyn Poliakoff, and their younger son is the playwright Stephen Poliakoff.

He was appointed OBE in the 1982 New Year Honours.

His reminiscences were published in The Silver Samovar - Atlantida Press 1996 (ISBN 5-88011-013-3)

References

1910 births
1996 deaths
Officers of the Order of the British Empire
Alexander
Emigrants from the Russian Empire to the United Kingdom
British Jews
British people of Russian-Jewish descent